PP-111 Faisalabad-XV is a Constituency of Provincial Assembly of Punjab.

General elections 2013

General elections 2008

See also
 PP-110 Faisalabad-XIV
 PP-112 Faisalabad-XVI

References

External links

Provincial constituencies of Punjab, Pakistan